William or Bill Griggs may refer to:

William Griggs (physician), doctor involved in Salem witch trials
William Griggs (inventor) (1832–1911), English inventor of a process of photolithography
Bill Griggs, Australian trauma and emergency medical retrieval doctor
Billy Griggs (American football)
Billy Griggs, BMX racer
Will Griggs, fictional character in Neighbours

See also
William Grigg (disambiguation)